Supermarket Superstar is an American reality-competition cooking television series which aired from July to September 2013 on Lifetime. Produced by Eli Holzman, Rhett Bachner, Michael Chiarello and Bob and Harvey Weinstein, it was hosted by Stacy Keibler. In each episode, three aspiring food entrepreneurs competed for a chance to win $10,000 in cash and consultation services valued at $100,000 from DINE Marketing and Mattson. In the final episode, three previous winners competed for a chance to have their products introduced and sold in The Great Atlantic & Pacific Tea Company (A&P) family of supermarkets. The panel of judges ("mentors") was Debbi Fields of Mrs. Fields Bakeries, Chris Cornyn of DINE and Chiarello.

Format 
Three contestants each present a product to the mentors in the product-pitch segment. After receiving an evaluation from the mentors, they modify the product in the test kitchen (taking into consideration price, taste, nutrition and shelf life) in the recipe-revamp segment. The contestants have 90 minutes to make changes. In the kitchen, they receive more advice and criticism from Chiarello and research-and-development expert Andrew Hunter. The finished product is presented to a focus group, who eat and discuss it with Fields before filling out a survey in the focus-test segment. After the focus group's comments are reviewed, Chirarello announces which dish was rated highest and which contestant is eliminated. The remaining two contestants then work on the logo and packaging of their products with graphic designers from 99designs and mentoring from Chris Cornyn of DINE Marketing in the brand-development segment. The products and designs are presented to "the supermarket buyer", A&P Supermarkets operating partner Tom Dahlen. Dahlen is joined in his office by the mentors and Keibler, who give him their opinion before the contestants return and he announces the winner. In the final episode, Dahlen is joined by A&P president and CEO Sam Martin to pick the winner.

Episodes

Reception 
David Hinckley gave the show two stars out of five, calling the mentors' advice instructive but wondering if most viewers would come away wondering if a slice of Sean's cake would cause their guests to put lampshades on their heads. In a Media Life Magazine review, Tom Conroy wrote after its premiere that the show was "worth a taste" and called the mentors' comments insightful. He disliked the amount of detail about the contestants' personal lives and found the series' title misleading, conjuring up an image of shoppers stuffing supermarket baskets.

Gwen Ihnat of the A.V. Club graded Supermarket Superstar C+ after the first episode, writing that it would have been interesting to discuss only two of the four issues in the test kitchen (nutrition and shelf life) and wishing that the supermarket buyer would explain what makes a consumer choose one product over another. According to Ihnat, there were too many reality-show cliches such as "This is my only shot".

See also 
Recipe to Riches

References

External links 

2010s American cooking television series
2013 American television series debuts
2013 American television series endings
English-language television shows
Food reality television series
Food retailers of the United States
Lifetime (TV network) original programming
Television series by All3Media
The Great Atlantic & Pacific Tea Company
Television series by The Weinstein Company